Ralph William Pickford (11 February 1903 – 7 June 1986) was an English psychologist who served as the first Professor of Psychology at the University of Glasgow in Glasgow, Scotland, United Kingdom, from 1955 to 1973. He first joined the University's faculty in 1930, and received a D. Litt. degree from there in 1947. In 2005, the University established the Pickford Travelling Fellowship in his honor. In 1971, he married his second wife, Laura Ruth Bowyer, and they remained married until his death in 1986. Bowyer later provided one of the two bequests that was first used to fund the Pickford Travelling Fellowship (the other came from a trust set up after Pickford died).

References

English psychologists
1903 births
1986 deaths
People from Christchurch, Dorset
Alumni of Emmanuel College, Cambridge
Alumni of the University of Glasgow
Academics of the University of Glasgow
20th-century psychologists